"Wait on You" is a song performed by American contemporary worship bands Elevation Worship and Maverick City Music, which features vocals from Dante Bowe and Chandler Moore. The song was released on April 23, 2021, as a promotional single from their collaborative live album, Old Church Basement (2021). The song was written by Brandon Lake, Chandler Moore, Chris Brown, Dante Bowe, Steven Furtick, and Tiffany Hudson.

"Wait on You" debuted at No. 9 on the US Hot Christian Songs chart, and at No. 1 on the Hot Gospel Songs chart. "Wait on You" was nominated for the Grammy Award for Best Gospel Performance/Song at the 2022 Grammy Awards.

Background
On April 23, 2021, Elevation Worship and Maverick City Music released "Wait on You" featuring Dante Bowe and Chandler Moore as the third and final promotional single from their collaborative live album, Old Church Basement, along with its accompanying music video.

The song was described as a "a declaration of God’s faithfulness, even when circumstances may be discouraging." The song's theme draws inspiration from the bible in Isaiah 40:31, which says "They that wait upon the Lord shall renew their strength; they shall mount up with wings as eagles; they shall run, and not be weary, and they shall walk, and not faint."

Composition

Commercial performance
"Wait on You" debuted at No. 9 on the US Hot Christian Songs chart and at No. 1 on the Hot Gospel Songs chart, both dated May 8, 2021. "Wait on You" attracted 2.1 million streams and 3,000 downloads in the United States in its first week. "Wait on You" is Elevation Worship's ninth top ten entry on Hot Christian Songs, Maverick City Music's third top ten entry, Dante Bowe's first top ten entry, and Chandler Moore's second top ten entry.

Accolades

Music videos
On April 23, 2021, Elevation Worship released the official music video of "Wait on You" on their YouTube channel. The video shows Dante Bowe and Chandler Moore leading the song.

On April 30, 2021, Elevation Worship published the lyric video of the song on YouTube.

Charts

Weekly charts

Year-end charts

Release history

References

External links
 

2021 songs
Elevation Worship songs
Maverick City Music songs
Dante Bowe songs
Chandler Moore songs
Songs written by Brandon Lake
Songs written by Steven Furtick
Songs written by Dante Bowe
Songs written by Chandler Moore